Justo is a Spanish surname and male given name meaning just, i.e. fair.

Given name
Notable people with this given name include:

 José Justo Corro (1794-1864), Mexican president
 José Justo Milla (1794–1838), Honduran military leader
 Justo Albarracín (born 1951), Argentine equestrian
 Justo Almario (born 1949), Colombian musician
 Justo Figuerola (1770–1854), Peruvian president
 Justo Gallego Martínez (born 1925), Spanish monk
 Justo Giani (born 1999), Argentinian football player
 Justo Jacquet (born 1961), football player
 Justo Jorge Padrón (1943–2021), Spanish poet, essayist and translator
 Justo José de Urquiza (1801–1870), Argentinian general and politician
 Justo L. González (born 1937), Cuban theologist
 Justo Lamas, Argentinian singer
 Justo Lorente (born 1994), Nicaraguan football player
 Justo Rufino Barrios (1835–1885), Guatemalan politician
 Justo Sierra (1848–1912), Mexican writer
 Justo Tejada (born 1933), Spanish football player
 Dom Justo Takayama (1552–1615), Japanese Christian and samurai
 Justo Villar (born 1977), Paraguayan football player
 Justo de Santa María de Oro (1772–1836), Argentinian statesman and bishop

Surname
Notable people with this surname include:
 Agustín Pedro Justo (1876–1943), Argentinian president
 Alicia Moreau de Justo (1885–1986), Argentinian physician and politician
 Juan B. Justo (1865–1928), Argentinian physician, journalist and politician
 Sara Justo (1870–1941), Argentine women's rights activist and dentist
 Virginia Justo (born 1963), Argentinian chess master
 Charles Justo (1980), Dominican American Actor/Model

Spanish masculine given names